Barend van der Meer (1659–1700) was a Dutch Golden Age still life painter.

Van der Meer was born and died in Haarlem.  According to the RKD he was taught by his father Jan van der Meer I and became a member of the Haarlem Guild of St. Luke in 1681. In 1683 he married and moved to Amsterdam. He was a follower of Willem Kalf and is known for still-life paintings and vanitas pieces. He was the brother of the landscape painter Jan Vermeer van Haarlem.

References

Barend van der Meer on Artnet

1659 births
1700 deaths
Dutch Golden Age painters
Dutch male painters
Artists from Haarlem
Painters from Haarlem
Dutch still life painters